The Melanesia Cup 1990 was the third Melanesia-wide tournament ever held. It took place in Vanuatu and five teams participated: Fiji, Solomon Islands, New Caledonia, Vanuatu and Papua New Guinea.

The teams played each other according to a round-robin format with Vanuatu winning the tournament for the first time.

Results

Melanesia Cup
1990–91 in OFC football
1990
1990 in Vanuatuan sport
November 1990 sports events in Oceania